The 2004 European Parliament election in Latvia was the election of MEPs representing Latvia constituency for the 2004-2009 term of the European Parliament. It was part of the wider 2004 European election. The vote took place on 12 June.

There were lists of candidates from 16 political parties. with a total of 1019 candidates. The voter turnout was 41.20%, with 574,674   voters casting votes. It was significantly lower than the usual turnout for Latvian parliamentary elections (which has been between 71% and 73% for previous three elections) but higher than the turnout in most of other countries which joined EU together with Latvia in 2004.

The election was conducted according to party-list proportional representation system, with at least 5% of votes necessary to gain seats in the parliament. Out of 16 parties, five won seats in the European parliament. Several parties narrowly missed the 5% threshold.

Results
The elections were a major loss for the coalition government in power, as the three coalition parties together won only 14.2% of popular vote. Tautas Partija was the only coalition party to win a seat.

The winning party Tēvzemei un Brīvībai/LNNK had most votes in 22 of 26 counties and 5 of 7 cities. The exception was Southeast Latvia (Daugavpils, Krāslava and Rezekne districts and cities of Daugavpils and Rēzekne) which were won by the Par Cilvēka Tiesībām Vienotā Latvijā party and Ludza district won by Socialist Party of Latvia, due to large percentage of ethnically Russian voters in this area.

Elected MEPs

See also
Politics of Latvia

Latvia
European Parliament elections in Latvia
2004 in Latvia